The BMW F800R is a naked motorcycle introduced by BMW Motorrad in 2009. The F-series also includes the F800S (discontinued), the dual-sport F800GS & F650GS, and the sport touring F800ST, which was replaced by the F800GT in 2013.

The F800R was first introduced when Streetbike freestyle World Champion, Chris Pfeiffer started using the custom bike for his tricks. Pfeiffer first started using a BMW F800S in January 2006, and eventually transformed the S into an R model in order to lighten the weight of the bike and make it more suitable for motorcycle stunt riding. In honor of Pfeiffer, BMW is offering a limited edition of 68 Chris-Pfeiffer-Edition BMW F800R models,
which has custom paintwork and an Akrapovič exhaust.

References

External links

 F800R official pages at BMW Motorrad International
 Chris Pfeiffer

F800R
Motorcycles introduced in 2009
Standard motorcycles